Elizabeth Coffey is an American actress. She had notable roles in four of the early films of John Waters. Coffey is a transgender woman.

Biography
Coffey was born in 1948 in Brooklyn, NY.

She is considered one of the Dreamlanders, Waters' ensemble of regular cast and crew members.

At the time of her first film appearance in Waters' Pink Flamingos (1972), Coffey was a pre-operative transgender woman who had already undergone hormone therapy to develop breasts and female features. She played the part of a beautiful woman who turns the tables on a perverted flasher/voyeur by exposing herself and flashing him, sending him fleeing in shock. Coffey underwent gender confirmation surgery a week after her scene was filmed. She was one of the first trans women to get gender confirmation surgery from Johns Hopkins Hospital.

She also appears in Waters' film, Female Trouble (1974) playing Earnestine, the sorrowful death row cellmate of Dawn Davenport (Divine). She also appeared in Waters’ films Desperate Living and Hairspray.

Coffey is currently divorced, with one adopted child. She remains in contact with Waters, and has worked with several AIDS-related charities.

She currently lives in Philadelphia in the John C. Anderson Apartments, an LGBTQ-friendly senior living community, where she co-facilitates TransWay, a trans and gender non-conforming support group.
She once lived in Rockford, Illinois.

Filmography
Pink Flamingos (1972) as trans flasher
Female Trouble (1974) as Earnestine
Desperate Living (1977) as bartender
Hairspray (1988) as Dance kid mom

References

External links

Dreamland website

American film actresses
Transgender actresses
Living people
American LGBT actors
LGBT people from New York (state)
1948 births